Timbang may refer to the following places:

Timbang Island, island in the Malaysian state of Sabah
Timbang Langkat, populated place in the Indonesian province of North Sumatra